Khonuu (Xonuu) is a rural locality (a selo) and the administrative center of Momsky District in the Sakha Republic, Russia, located on the right bank of the Indigirka River. Population:

Geography
It is also situated on the right bank of the Indigirka River, just downstream of the confluence with its tributary the Moma.

History
It was founded in 1931.

The nearby Moma Natural Park is a major tourist attraction that was established on 18 June 1996.

Demographics
Yakuts, who are primarily hunters or reindeer herders, make up 67% of the population. Other ethnicities include Russians (15.1%), Evens (11.8%), Evenks (0.5%), and Yukaghirs (0.1%).

Transportation
There are no railroads or paved roads, but there is a flight service to Yakutsk via the nearby Moma Airport.

Climate
Khonuu has an extreme subarctic climate (Köppen climate classification Dfd). Precipitation is quite low and is somewhat higher in summer than at other times of the year.

References

Notes

Sources
Official website of the Sakha Republic. Registry of the Administrative-Territorial Divisions of the Sakha Republic. Momsky District. 

Rural localities in Momsky District
Populated places established in 1931
1931 establishments in Russia
Road-inaccessible communities of the Sakha Republic
Indigirka basin